Luz Maria Cavazos (born 21 December 1968) is a Mexican actress. She won Best Actress awards at the Tokyo Film Festival, and Brazil's Festival de Gramado for her portrayal of "Tita" in Like Water for Chocolate. The film received the attention of US film critics and moviegoers, and facilitated her entry into the American film industry. She subsequently relocated to Los Angeles.

Early life and career 
Born in Monterrey, Cavazos began her acting career at the age of 15. In 1985, she was a student at Guadalajara's Preparatoria 4 University. She later chose to enroll in the Centro Universitario de Teatro Uniam in 1990. She left her parents and nine siblings to pursue her own interests. She made her film debut in Busi Cortes' 1988 El Secreto de Romalia. She has acted in numerous Mexican films and television series since then, and has also done a fair amount of work in the U.S., appearing in television dramas as well as a singing role in the film Sugar Town. Cavazos is sometimes credited as "Rosita Lumi Cavazos".

She had a featured role in Bottle Rocket, the debut film of director Wes Anderson.

She also played the character Tita for the movie Like Water for Chocolate.

Personal life 
She was dating one of her co-stars in the film "Like Water for Chocolate." Marco Leonardi from 1991 to 1999.

She is married to Joselo Rangel of the band Cafe Tacvba, with whom she has two daughters. They married in July 1999.

Filmography 

 En un bosque de la China (1987)
 El túnel de la ciencia (1989) (Documentary) .... herself
 Serpientes y escaleras (1992) .... Rebeca
 Like Water for Chocolate (1992) .... Tita
 Mi primer año (1992)
 Fray Bartolomé de las Casas (1993)
 Tres Destinos (1993) TV .... Cristina
 Del otro lado del mar (1994)
 Manhattan Merengue (1995) (as Rosita Lumi Cavazes)
 Banditi (1995)
 Viva San Isidro (1995) .... Antonia
 Bottle Rocket (1996) .... Inez
 Land of Milk and Honey (1996) .... Rosie
 El Vuelo del águila (1996) TV .... Amada Díaz
 Last Stand at Saber River (1997) TV .... Luz
 Sístole Diástole (1997) .... La nena
 Fibra óptica (1998) .... María Ponce
 Máscara (1999) .... Laura
 Sugar Town (1999) .... Rocío
 Entre la tarde y la noche (1999)
 The Keening (1999) .... Wood Nymph
 Bless the Child (2000) .... Sister Rosa
 Atlético San Pancho (2001) .... Rebeca
 In the Time of the Butterflies (2001) (TV) .... Patria Mirabal
 Exposed (2003) .... Laura Silvera
 Entre dos (2003)
 Tan infinito como el desierto (2004) TV
 7 días (2005) .... Sra. Garza
 La Ley del silencio (2005) TV .... Clemencia
 Las Buenrostro (2005)
 Viva High School Musical: Mexico (2008)
 La Mitad del Mundo (2009).... Juana
  Rock Mari(2010)
 2 Gritos de muerte y libertad(2010)....Josefa de Ortiz Dominguez
 Once upon a time in Durango(2010)
 Por Siempre Joan Sebestian(2016).... Cecilia
 Olimpia- (2018)....Hernan's mother
 The Promise....(2018)
 This is not Berlin- Susana....(2019)
 The Devils mark....(2020)
  Cecilia(2021)
 Siempre Madre: Paraiso en pugna (2022)

References

External links 

VH1 biography

1968 births
Living people
Mexican film actresses
Actresses from Monterrey
20th-century Mexican actresses
21st-century Mexican actresses